Old Stone is a 2016 Chinese-Canadian drama film directed by Johnny Ma. It was selected to be screened in the Discovery section at the 2016 Toronto International Film Festival.

The film tells the story of Lao Shi (Chen Gang), a cab driver in China whose life spirals out of control after he hits a motorcyclist, leaving him trapped in a bureaucratic nightmare because Chinese laws effectively criminalize such an accident far more harshly if the driver stops to help the victim than they do if he simply leaves the victim to die.

Cast
 Chen Gang as Lao Shi
 An Nai as Mao Mao
 Wang Hongwei as Captain
 Zhang Zebin as Li Jiang
 Lou Xue'er as Xue'er

Awards
The film was named the winner of TIFF's award for Best Canadian First Feature Film. On 7 December 2016, it was named to TIFF's annual Canada's Top 10 list.

The film garnered five Canadian Screen Award nominations at the 5th Canadian Screen Awards in 2017, for Best Picture, Best Actor (Chen), Best Original Screenplay (Ma), Best Cinematography (Leung Ming-kai) and Best Editing (Michael Long). It won the Canadian Screen Award for Best First Feature.

References

External links
 
 

2016 films
2016 drama films
2016 thriller drama films
Canadian thriller drama films
Chinese thriller drama films
2016 directorial debut films
Best First Feature Genie and Canadian Screen Award-winning films
Films directed by Johnny Ma
2010s Mandarin-language films
2010s Canadian films